Ima Robot is an American band based in Los Angeles, California, United States, that formed in the late 1990s. They have released several albums, EPs, and singles, most notably Ima Robot in 2003, Search and Destroy and Monument to the Masses in 2006, and Another Man's Treasure in 2010. The band's song, "Greenback Boogie", a B-side to Another Man's Treasure, is the main theme song of the USA Network legal drama series Suits.

History
In the 1990s, singer/rapper Alex Ebert and guitarist Tim "Timmy the Terror" Anderson worked together under various names including 13's Lucky, The Window Club, and Eiffel Tower Window Masters before deciding on the band name Ima Robot. The phrase "Ima Robot" came from an inside joke between members of the band, which Ebert has stated "was something that we thought was really, really, really, really funny, and I can't, for the life of me, remember why" In 1997, the duo recruited keyboardist/bassist Oliver "Oligee" Goldstein. The trio would perform with various frequently changing members until they recruited drummer Rich Lambert in December 2000 and bassist Justin Meldal-Johnsen in November 2001. The band recorded numerous untitled demo CDs through the late 90's and early 2000's.

Signing with Virgin Records
In mid/late 2002, Ima Robot was signed to Virgin Records. As Ebert described, the first thing Virgin Chairman/CEO said about the band: "The first thing Matt Serletic said was that seeing us was like seeing the Ramones for the first time, and that he felt this kind of energy that we needed to capture and not try to gloss and glean over." Lambert was let go the day after the band was signed and was replaced by studio drummer Joey Waronker.

===Ima Robot'''===
On September 16, 2003, Ima Robot released their first full-length album, the self-titled Ima Robot. The album featured the singles "Dynomite" and "Song #1" (released in the UK only).

In 2004, Waronker and "Oligee" left the band. Meldal-Johnsen followed in 2005, with former Oleander drummer Scott Devours. Tim Anderson's cousin, whom he had never met before Devours, auditioned and took over the drums. Filip Nikolić took over the bass and Andy Marlow started playing the keyboards. In the process of writing their second album, the band recorded the EP "Search and Destroy", which they released and distributed independently at shows starting on April 5, 2006.

Monument to the Masses
On September 12, 2006, they released their second album Monument to the Masses, which featured the singles "Creeps Me Out" and "Lovers in Captivity".

Departure from Virgin Records and post-departure
In April 2007, the band won their independence from Virgin Records and continued to work unsigned under the management of Alexis Rivera of Echo Park Records. The song "Gangster" premiered on the band's MySpace on April 15, 2008, with its lyrics posted in a blog entry by the band. In 2010 the band announced the upcoming release of their new album, Another Man's Treasure, and released the song "Ruthless" on the Internet.

Ebert remained frustrated with Virgin, saying in a 2016 interview with Transverso Media that, "pretty unironically I ended up feeling like a robot by the end of the process because of the major label thing." During that period, they were being represented by the Werewolf Heart label.

In June 2008, Lars Vognstrup joined the group, having previously played with Nikolić in the band Junior Senior. In 2009, Orpheo McCord (of Edward Sharpe and the Magnetic Zeros and of Fool's Gold), Jason "ComputerJay" Taylor, and Jonas Petri Megyessi joined the band.

On January 6, 2011, the band played six songs live on KCRW's Morning Becomes Eclectic. This was the first time since Monument to the Masses tours that the new band lineup had played live. Ima Robot's B-side "Greenback Boogie" from the album Another Man's Treasure has been featured as the theme song of the USA Network legal drama, Suits, since 2011.

The band has been inactive since 2011 as its members have been busy with side projects. Alex Ebert has stated that he is "still in Ima Robot."

Band members
Current
 Alex Ebert – lead vocals (1998–Present)
 Timmy "The Terror" Anderson –  guitar (1998–Present)
 Filip "Turbotito" Nikolić – bass guitar (2004–Present)
 Jason "One Three/Computer Jay" Taylor – keyboards (2001, 2009–Present)
 Jonas Petri Megyessi – guitar, percussion (2009–Present)
 Orpheo McCord – drums (2009–Present)

Past
 Rich Lambert - drums (2000-2002)
 Joey Waronker – drums (2003–2004)
 Oliver "Oligee" Goldstein – keyboard, guitar (1998–2004)
 Justin Meldal-Johnsen – bass guitar (2001–2004)
 Scott Devours – drums (2005–2009)
 Andy Marlow – keyboards, (2005–2007)
 Lars Vognstrup – keyboards, (2008–2009)

Discography
Studio albums
 Untitled Demo Album (1999)
 Ima Robot (September 16, 2003)
 Monument to the Masses (September 12, 2006)
 Another Man's Treasure'' (October 19, 2010)

EPs
 Various Untitled Demo CDs (199?-2002)
 "Black Jettas" (LP) (June 19, 2003)
 "Public Access EP" (CD/LP) (June 20, 2003)
 "Song #1" (EP) – (March 22, 2004)
 "Alive" (EP) – (2004) – Radio Only
 "Search And Destroy" (EP) (2006) – Sold only at shows originally and came free with the purchase of "Another Man's Treasure" from the band's website in 2010.

Singles
 "Dynomite" (Maxi Single) (CD/LP) (September, 2003)
 "Creeps Me Out" (June 13, 2006) – Digital Only
 "Gangster" (April 15, 2008) – Digital Only
 "Ruthless" (June, 2010) – Digital Only

References

External links
 Official PureVolume

Virgin Records artists
American power pop groups
Musical groups from Los Angeles
Rock music groups from California
Dance-rock musical groups
Musical groups established in 1998